Harry Lee Reynolds Jr. (born June 8, 1964), commonly known as Butch Reynolds, is an American former track and field athlete who competed in the 400 meter dash. He held the world record for the event for 11 years 9 days with his personal best time of 43.29 seconds set in 1988. That year, he was the silver medalist at the 1988 Seoul Olympics (behind Steve Lewis) and a relay gold medalist. He was falsely accused and banned for drug use for two years by the IAAF; until The United States Supreme Court ruled in favor of Reynolds due to an apparent drug testing procedural flaw. Reynolds was awarded $27.3 million dollars due to the false accusation damages; however, he never received a penny.

On his competitive return he became the 1993 World Indoor Champion and won two successive 400 meter silver medals at the World Championships in Athletics. He also enjoyed success with the 4×400 meter relay team, winning the world title three times in his career with the United States (1987, 1993 and 1995). His team's time of 2:54.29 minutes at the 1993 World Championships in Athletics is the current world record. Reynolds remains the third fastest of all-time in the 400 m after Michael Johnson, the former world record holder, and Wayde van Niekerk, the current world record holder.

In 2016, he was elected into the National Track and Field Hall of Fame.

Career

Reynolds was born in Akron, Ohio. On August 17, 1988, aged 24 years and 70 days, he set a 400-meter world record with 43.29 seconds, smashing Lee Evans' nearly 20-year-old 1968 world record by 0.57 seconds. Reynolds' record had negative splits, meaning that the second half of the race was completed more quickly than the first half, and was the first time anyone had set a world record for the men's 400 meters with negative splits.  His splits were 21.9 seconds for the opening 200 meters and 21.4 seconds for the closing 200 meters, giving a differential of -0.5 seconds.  This record stood for 11 years, 9 days and was broken by Michael Johnson (43.18) in August 1999.  Wayde van Niekerk broke Michael Johnson's record in 2016 in a time of 43.03.  Reynolds remains the third fastest of all-time over the distance, and Olympic champions Jeremy Wariner, Quincy Watts, LaShawn Merritt and Kirani James, plus Isaac Makwala, the African champion from 2012 and 2014, and Fred Kerley, the NCAA record holder, are the only others to have come within half a second of his best mark.

He won a silver medal in the 1988 Summer Olympics in the 400 meters and a gold medal in the 4 x 400 m relay. In the IAAF World Championships in Athletics he won a bronze medal in 1987, and silver medals in 1993 and 1995. He also won gold medals on the 4 x 400 meter relays in 1987, 1993 and 1995.  The 1993 World Championship team with Andrew Valmon, Watts and Johnson still holds the world record for the relay.

In the 1996 American Olympic trials he finished second behind Michael Johnson, clocking 43.91, the fastest non-winning 400 meters performance until 26 August 2015. However, in the 1996 Summer Olympics semifinal, he suffered a hamstring injury, failed to qualify for the final, and also had to withdraw from the relay team.

He retired after the 1999 season. Reynolds has since established the Butch Reynolds Care for Kids Foundation and was the speed coach for the Ohio State University football team up until his resignation in April 2008. Butch resumed coaching when he was hired as the sprint coach for Ohio Dominican University in Columbus in 2014. His first season as coach led to an improvement of 20 points at the GLIAC Outdoor Meet and the emergence of one of the best young sprinters in the GLIAC.

Drug Suspension

Butch Reynolds was suspended for two years by the IAAF for alleged illegal drug use in 1990. This was the start of a long legal fight, after which the United States Supreme Court  ordered the United States Olympic Committee to allow him to participate in the 1992 U.S. Olympic trials, after finding the testing procedures were flawed from the beginning. Testers had marked specimen "H6" as testing positive while Reynolds' blood specimen was "H5". Lab director Jean-Pierre LaFarge claimed in court that, in spite of the markings, the technician had told him that specimen "H5" was the positive one.  Yet "H6" was circled on two separate documents by the technician.

IAAF and IOC controversy

This injunction brought American law and equity into conflict with the rules of International Olympic Committee (IOC) and International Association of Athletics Federations (IAAF), which prohibited suspended athletes from competing. In fact, the IAAF threatened to suspend any athlete that competed against Butch Reynolds. The American Olympic trial 400 meters heats were postponed for four days, but the IAAF finally backed down. Reynolds finished fifth in the trials, and qualified for a place as a substitute on the American 4 x 400 meters relay team. However, the IAAF (which had administered the flawed test) then banned him from competing in the 1992 Olympics.

That same year Reynolds also won a libel suit against the IAAF, and was awarded $27.3 million in damages. The IAAF stated that the ruling, made in Ohio, had no bearing upon the organization and was invalid. A federal appeals panel later overturned the verdict on jurisdictional grounds.

See also
 List of doping cases in athletics

References

External links
 
 
 
 
 

1964 births
Living people
American male sprinters
World Athletics record holders (relay)
World record setters in athletics (track and field)
African-American male track and field athletes
American sportspeople in doping cases
Doping cases in athletics
Athletes (track and field) at the 1988 Summer Olympics
Athletes (track and field) at the 1996 Summer Olympics
Olympic gold medalists for the United States in track and field
Olympic silver medalists for the United States in track and field
Ohio State University alumni
Ohio State Buckeyes men's track and field athletes
Ohio State Buckeyes football coaches
Sportspeople from Akron, Ohio
Track and field athletes from Ohio
World Athletics Championships medalists
Butler Community College alumni
Medalists at the 1988 Summer Olympics
World Athletics Indoor Championships winners
World Athletics Championships winners
21st-century African-American people
20th-century African-American sportspeople